"Annie Laurie" is a popular poem and song.

Annie Laurie may also refer to:

 Annie Laurie (1916 film), a silent British film directed by Cecil Hepworth
 Annie Laurie (1927 film), a silent American film starring Lillian Gish
 Annie Laurie (1936 short film), an American short film
 Annie Laurie (1936 film), a British film
 Annie Laurie (musician) (1924–2006), American rhythm and blues singer
 Annie Laurie, or Slim Whitman Sings Annie Laurie, album by Slim Whitman, 1959
 Pen name of 19th century yellow journalist Winifred Sweet Black Bonfils